Unicachi District is one of seven districts of the province Yunguyo in Puno Region, Peru.

History 
Unicachi District was created by Law No. 23382 (May 18, 1982), in second term of Fernando Belaúnde Terry.

Ethnic groups 
The people in the district are mainly indigenous citizens of Aymara descent. Aymara is the language which the majority of the population (68.45%) learnt to speak in childhood, 30.80% of the residents started speaking using the Spanish language (2007 Peru Census).

Authorities

Mayors 
 2011-2014:  José Coarita Yapuchura. 
 2007-2010: Elmer Ladislao Yapuchura Uchasara.

Festivities 
 Saint Peter and Saint Paul.
 Our Lady of the Rosary.

See also 
 Intini Uyu Pata
 Tupu Inka
 Administrative divisions of Peru

References

External links 
 INEI Perú